Aripo Cave (Aripo Main Cave) is a cave in the Northern Range, in Trinidad and Tobago. This is the longest accessible cave in Trinidad and Tobago, with 862 m length and 160 m depth.  It is one of several caves created by recrystallised  limestone.  The cave is a notable bat roost, and that bats contribute considerable amounts of guano, which in turn support vast numbers of cave-dwelling invertebrates.

One of the caves more notable inhabitants are the Oilbirds. These are the only nocturnal fruit-eating birds in the world. They forage at night, navigating by echolocation in the same way as the bats.

Flora
During the month of February the Aripo Forest becomes brightly decorated with the fiery orange blossom of the mountain immortelles (Erythrina poeppigiana). These trees were originally planted to provide shade for the cocoa and it is believed when the immortelle bloom it signifies the start of the dry season.

References

External links
Oilbird Caves of Trinidad

Natural history of Trinidad and Tobago
Caves of Trinidad and Tobago
Caves of the Caribbean